The 2006 House elections in Kentucky occurred on November 7, 2006 to elect the members of the State of Kentucky's delegation to the United States House of Representatives. Kentucky had six seats in the House, apportioned according to the 2000 United States Census.

These elections occurred simultaneously with the United States Senate elections of 2006, the United States House elections in other states, and various state and local elections.

Overview

District 1

Incumbent Republican Congressman Ed Whitfield faced off against former Congressman Thomas Barlow, the Democratic nominee, winning by a solid margin, but less than he is used to in this west Kentucky-based district.

District 2

Incumbent Ron Lewis (R) was sought a sixth term in this conservative, west-central Kentucky district. Lewis has had no trouble winning reelection after succeeding longtime Democrat William Natcher. His special election victory turned out to be the first sign of the Republican wave later that year. But when first elected, he had promised to serve only six full terms. He was challenged by state Representative Mike Weaver, whose background in business and War Veteran of both Korea and Vietnam made it hard to portray him as a liberal. However, Weaver had trouble raising money. Ultimately, Weaver was unable to capitalize on the Democratic wave sweeping the country, and lost to Lewis.

District 3

Incumbent Anne Northup (R) had been a target for the Democrats since her election in 1996; in 2004 and 2000, John Kerry and Al Gore both won her Louisville-centered congressional district by two percent, and Bill Clinton won the district by double-digit margins during the 1990s. While Northup had generally run close races, she won 60% of the vote in the 2004 election. Redistricting after the 2000 census added a few more suburban Republicans to the district, according to Congressional Quarterly. The Democratic candidate was John Yarmuth, the founder of local free publication LEO. In spite of Northup's electoral success, excellent constituent services, and popularity among blue-collar voters in southern Louisville, Democrats saw this race as winnable, calling attention to Northup's 91% lockstep voting record with an unpopular President Bush. Northup led in most polls until October, when Yarmuth began to gain. By election night, the race had become highly competitive. House Majority Leader John Boehner referred to Northup as the Republicans' "canary in the coal mine", meaning that her fortunes would portend the outcome of House elections nationwide. This proved to be a correct assessment, as on election night, Yarmuth defeated Northup and Republicans lost control of the House.

District 4

First-term incumbent Geoff Davis (R) was being challenged by retired U.S. Air Force Major Ken Lucas (D), who held the seat from 1999 to 2005. Lucas defeated Davis 51% to 48% in 2002, and retired in 2004, adhering to a pledge of serving only three consecutive terms in the House. Lucas was among the most conservative Democrats in Congress and remains well known in the district, which includes most of Kentucky's share of the Cincinnati metropolitan area. Brian Houillion (L) entered the race on June 19. In late July The Washington Post also rated the race as a toss-up.  However, Davis is an aggressive campaigner who had spent much time in the district, which ultimately paid off, as Davis defeated Lucas by a surprisingly wide margin.

District 5

Incumbent Republican Congressman Hal Rogers faced off against Democratic nominee Kenneth Stepp, who was not a serious contender for the seat considering this east Kentucky district's strong conservative tendencies.

District 6

Opposed by only Libertarian candidate Paul Ard, incumbent Democratic Congressman Ben Chandler faced no serious obstacle in his bid for a third term.

References

Kentucky

2006
2006 Kentucky elections